Sergey Vyacheslavovich Krivets (born 8 June 1986) is a Belarusian professional footballer who plays as a midfielder for Wiara Lecha Poznań.

Club career
Krivets scored BATE Borisov's (and a Belarusian side's) first ever Champions League group stage goal against Juventus on 30 September 2008, having been set up by teammate Igor Stasevich.

On 22 December 2009, Lech Poznań signed the Belarusian midfielder from BATE Borisov Borisov until June 2013.

On 9 July 2012, Jiangsu Sainty signed the Belarusian midfielder from Lech Poznań until the end of 2015. On 20 June 2013, Krivets had his Jiangsu Sainty contract terminated by mutual consent.

On 25 July 2017, he signed a contract with Arka Gdynia. Krivets joined Dynamo Brest in June 2018, putting pet to paper on a contract for two and a half years. 

On 6 February 2021, he returned to Lech to join the reserves team, with the aim of mentoring youth players. He left the team at the end of the 2021–22 season after his contract had expired.

On 11 August 2022, he was registered to play for fan-owned V liga side Wiara Lecha Poznań.

International career
Krivets made his debut for the national team on 2 February 2008, in a 2–0 win over Iceland as part of the 2008 Malta International Football Tournament.

International goals

Honours

Club
BATE
 Belarusian Premier League: 2006, 2007, 2008, 2009, 2013, 2014
 Belarusian Cup: 2005–06, 2009–10
 Belarusian Super Cup: 2014

Lech Poznań
 Ekstraklasa: 2009–10

Jiangsu Sainty
 Chinese Super League runners-up: 2012
 Chinese FA Super Cup: 2013

Dinamo Brest
 Belarusian Premier League champion: 2019
 Belarusian Super Cup: 2020

Individual
 Belarusian Premier League Best Player: 2009
 The best 22 Players of Belarusian Premier League by FFB (4):  2007, 2008, 2009, 2013
 Chinese FA Super Cup Most Valuable Player: 2013

References

External links
 Player profile on official FC BATE website
 
 
 
 

1986 births
Living people
Sportspeople from Grodno
Belarusian footballers
Association football midfielders
Belarus international footballers
Belarus under-21 international footballers
Belarusian expatriate footballers
Expatriate footballers in Poland
Expatriate footballers in China
Expatriate footballers in France
Belarusian expatriate sportspeople in Poland
Belarusian expatriate sportspeople in China
Belarusian expatriate sportspeople in France
Belarusian Premier League players
Ekstraklasa players
Chinese Super League players
Ligue 1 players
Ligue 2 players
II liga players
FC SKVICH Minsk players
FC BATE Borisov players
Lech Poznań players
Jiangsu F.C. players
FC Metz players
Wisła Płock players
Arka Gdynia players
FC Dynamo Brest players
Lech Poznań II players